Tampere RC is a Finnish rugby club in Tampere.

External links
Tampere RC

Finnish rugby union teams
Sport in Tampere